Healesville is a railway station in Victoria, Australia. Formerly the terminus of the Healesville railway line, it is currently the principal station of the Yarra Valley Railway.

A temporary station was built on the site in 1888–1889 when the railway line was extended from Lilydale to Healesville.  The current station was built in 1903 and is now listed with Heritage Victoria.
The station closed along with the Healesville line in 1980. It sat idle for some years, but has now been restored as part of the Yarra Valley Railway, which is based out of Healesville. It currently opens on weekends, Wednesday of school holidays, and public holidays.  Walker Railmotor RM22 operates heading out for approximately 4.5 km to near Tarrawarra Winery, after traveling through the historic tunnel.

As of April 2010, works are currently underway to restore the line to Yarra Glen railway station.

Healesville Station is served by the route 685 bus (Lilydale to Healesville) operated by McKenzie's Tourist Services

Boom gates were fitted to the Healesville-Kinglake Road level crossing in September 2022 alongside a reconstruction of the level crossing.

Film and TV
The Internet Movie Database has Healesville Railway Station as a filming location for the Australian short film Harry's War (1999).

Healesville station was used for the railway station scene in John D. Lamond's 1979 "Ozploitation" film Felicity.

References

External links

Heritage Victoria: Healesville Railway Station Complex
Photograph of Healesville station, circa 1930
Photograph of steam engine R 303 and drivers at Healesville, 1898
 Melway map at street-directory.com.au

Tourist railway stations in Melbourne
Yarra Valley
Railway stations in the Shire of Yarra Ranges
Listed railway stations in Australia